The women's 10,000 metres event at the 1985 Summer Universiade was held at the Kobe Universiade Memorial Stadium in Kobe on 30 August 1985. It was the first time that the event was contested by women at the Universiade.

Results

References

Athletics at the 1985 Summer Universiade
1985